Mission 660 (a.k.a. The Alphax Z in Japan) is a vertically scrolling shooter arcade game released in 1986. The game was developed by Woodplace and licensed for distribution to Taito. The style is a mix of enemies resembling space fighters interspersed with flying mice, cats and skulls, giving the game an unusual feel.

1986 video games
Arcade video games
Arcade-only video games
Vertically scrolling shooters